True Devotion to the Immaculate Heart of Mary is a book by Fr. Robert J. Fox on the Roman Catholic theme of devotion to the Immaculate Heart of Mary.

The book discusses devotion to the Immaculate Heart of Mary from a Trinitarian and Christological perspective.  It has a nihil obstat and an imprimatur.

In May 2007 EWTN aired a book review on the program Living His Life Abundantly hosted by Johnnette S. Benkovic.

See also
 Blessed Virgin Mary (Roman Catholic)

References 
 Robert Joseph Fox, 1986 True Devotion to the Immaculate Heart of Mary Our Sunday Visitor Press 

Marian devotions
Catholic devotions
1986 non-fiction books
Books about Catholicism
Christian devotional literature